Mate Arapov (born 25 February 1976 in Split) is a Croatian sailor who competes in the Laser, Finn and Star classes.

A member of JK Mornar sailing club, Arapov sailed for Croatia in the Laser class at the 2000 and 2004 Summer Olympics. In 2000 he placed 43rd in the final standings, and in 2004 he was 14th overall.

Arapov was named Split Sportsman of the Year in 2004.

References

External links
 
 
 

1976 births
Living people
Sportspeople from Split, Croatia
Croatian male sailors (sport)
Olympic sailors of Croatia
Sailors at the 2000 Summer Olympics – Laser
Sailors at the 2004 Summer Olympics – Laser
21st-century Croatian people
20th-century Croatian people